Grupo Vimenca is a privately held group of financial services companies in Dominican Republic with headquarter in Santo Domingo. It was established in 1950 by President and Founder of the group Victor Méndez Capellán. This family-owned company that began as a small business with one employee, today offers consumers global money transfer services through Western Union, in addition to banking, mortgage, business-
to-business call center services, international holders and parcel services and multiply payments services.

History

The history of the group started with IATA agency. The first Dominican agency that had offered the program called “Travel now and pay later". Program which had given opportunity to more than 650 000 Dominicans to emigrate, in majority to United States. From here starts the story of Vimenca Group. 
In 1989, Vimenca obtained the exclusive representation of Western Union, to provide the services of transfer of money in the territory of the Dominican Republic.

Subsidiaries of Grupo Vimenca
, Vimenca Group comprises five service companies:
 Remesas Vimenca (exclusive agent of Western Union). Western Union entered the Dominican Republic in 1989 which now boasts a strong network of more than 205 locations through the country.
 Banco Vimenca (Banking Services) was set up as a multi-service bank by resolution of the Monetary Board on April 25, 2002
 Data Vimenca (BPO and Outsourcing Solutions) created in September 2004, with more than 500 employees has been providing inbound and outbound calling services in key areas such as financial support, back office, sales, customer service, technical support and customer retention.
 Vimenpaq (International Holders and Parcel Services) is a branded product between Vimenca and TransExpress, a US based company based in Miami, Florida, established in 1981. It is the leading provider of Global Post Cards in more than 80 countries worldwide.
 PagaTodo (Multiple Payments Services) with more than 400 points, were clients can pay all bills with one visit.

References

Financial services companies of the Dominican Republic
Brands of the Dominican Republic
Financial services companies established in 1950
1950 establishments in the Dominican Republic